Dereağzı is a village in the District of İncirliova, Aydın Province, Turkey. As of 2015, it had a population of 972 people.

References

Villages in İncirliova District